is a Japanese actor and model. He is the winner of the 12th Fine Boys Model Audition Grand Prix.

Filmography

Television

Film

References

External links
 
 

21st-century Japanese male actors
Japanese male television actors
Japanese male models
Living people
1995 births